Bridge Pa (sometimes spelled "Bridge Pā") is a rural Māori settlement and surrounding area in Hawke's Bay, New Zealand, located approximately 10 kilometres inland from Hastings. The pā itself comprises a school, a meetinghouse of the LDS Church, two marae (Korongata Marae and a later addition in 1984 of the Mangaroa Marae), a cemetery, a disused quarry, and the 140-year-old historical Homestead of the Puriri Family.

Bridge Pa is situated on flat land on the Heretaunga Plains with the major geographical feature of the township being the Karewarewa Stream. Located on the edge of an unconfined aquifer, the surrounding land is free-draining and is used for sheep grazing, horticulture and wine production.

The surrounding area includes Hastings Aerodrome, two golf clubs, a car club, and a Deer Stalkers hall. As well as the main settlement centred on the intersection of Maraekakaho Road and Raukawa Road, a satellite settlement is located on Ngatarawa Road (near the Valentine Road corner) and on State Highway 50 (near the corner with Maraekakaho Road in the shadow of Roy's Hill). A relatively large tract of the surrounding rural area (up to 5 km from the pā) is also classified as "Bridge Pa" by local authorities and the White Pages.

The main road through the town is limited to 50 km/h and traffic is slowed through a variety of traffic calming measures. There is no sewerage. There is  metropolitan style water reticulation. Wastewater is treated via individual homeowner septic tanks.

The rural setting experiences between -3 °C frosts in winter (usually clearing to clear crisp days) to 40 °C heat in late summer. Bridge Pa is approximately 20 km from the coast, and with the central North Island mountain ranges of the Ruahines and Kawekas to intercept the prevailing westerly winds, the region enjoys a Mediterranean climate with around 2350 sunshine hours per annum and very low humidity.

Demographics
Bridge Pa settlement is in four SA1 statistical areas, which cover . The SA1 areas are part of the Bridge Pa statistical area.

Bridge Pa settlement had a population of 618 at the 2018 New Zealand census, an increase of 102 people (19.8%) since the 2013 census, and an increase of 54 people (9.6%) since the 2006 census. There were 168 households, comprising 297 males and 318 females, giving a sex ratio of 0.93 males per female, with 165 people (26.7%) aged under 15 years, 111 (18.0%) aged 15 to 29, 255 (41.3%) aged 30 to 64, and 84 (13.6%) aged 65 or older.

Ethnicities were 44.2% European/Pākehā, 65.5% Māori, 3.9% Pacific peoples, 0.5% Asian, and 0.5% other ethnicities. People may identify with more than one ethnicity.

Although some people chose not to answer the census's question about religious affiliation, 34.5% had no religion, 55.3% were Christian, 2.9% had Māori religious beliefs, 0.5% were Hindu, 0.5% were Muslim and 0.5% had other religions.

Of those at least 15 years old, 63 (13.9%) people had a bachelor's or higher degree, and 93 (20.5%) people had no formal qualifications. 45 people (9.9%) earned over $70,000 compared to 17.2% nationally. The employment status of those at least 15 was that 228 (50.3%) people were employed full-time, 78 (17.2%) were part-time, and 18 (4.0%) were unemployed.

Bridge Pa statistical area

Bridge Pa had a population of 1,140 at the 2018 New Zealand census, an increase of 57 people (5.3%) since the 2013 census, and an increase of 117 people (11.4%) since the 2006 census. There were 225 households, comprising 738 males and 402 females, giving a sex ratio of 1.84 males per female. The median age was 35.8 years (compared with 37.4 years nationally), with 186 people (16.3%) aged under 15 years, 264 (23.2%) aged 15 to 29, 567 (49.7%) aged 30 to 64, and 123 (10.8%) aged 65 or older.

Ethnicities were 47.9% European/Pākehā, 57.1% Māori, 6.3% Pacific peoples, 1.6% Asian, and 1.6% other ethnicities. People may identify with more than one ethnicity.

The percentage of people born overseas was 10.3, compared with 27.1% nationally.

Although some people chose not to answer the census's question about religious affiliation, 40.8% had no religion, 46.1% were Christian, 6.3% had Māori religious beliefs, 0.3% were Hindu, 0.5% were Muslim, 0.3% were Buddhist and 2.4% had other religions.

Of those at least 15 years old, 105 (11.0%) people had a bachelor's or higher degree, and 180 (18.9%) people had no formal qualifications. The median income was $16,000, compared with $31,800 nationally. 78 people (8.2%) earned over $70,000 compared to 17.2% nationally. The employment status of those at least 15 was that 396 (41.5%) people were employed full-time, 120 (12.6%) were part-time, and 51 (5.3%) were unemployed.

Bridge Pa Triangle

Bridge Pa Triangle is a grape growing area roughly delineated by three roads: Ngatarawa Road, State Highway 50 and Maraekakaho Road. It is recognised as a premium wine growing area in the Hawke's Bay wine region. Wines grown include Merlot, Syrah, Chardonnay and Sauvignon blanc. In ancient times the area was blanketed by the pumice tephra of numerous Taupo volcanic events. Much of the Triangle area covers the historical (pre-1860s earthquake) riverbed of the nearby Ngaruroro River. As such soil types include Ngatarawa Gravels, Takapau Silty-loam (free draining red metal of mixed alluvial and volcanic origin) and shallow clay-loam soils with underlying deep free draining pumice.

Alwyn Corban and Garry Glazebrook of Ngatarawa Wines pioneered wine production in the area in the 1980s and it is only with the growth of other boutique wineries in the late 1990s the "Bridge Pa Triangle" has been delineated and named. The area is also sometimes described as The Maraekakaho Triangle and The Ngatarawa Triangle. Bordering Ngatarawa Road and to the north of the area along State Highway 50 is the Gimblett Gravels wine growing area.

Marae

Bridge Pa has two marae. Korongatā Marae and Nukanoa meeting house is a meeting place of the Ngāti Kahungunu hapū of Ngāti Pōporo and Ngāti Whatuiāpiti. Mangaroa Marae and Hikawera II meeting house is a meeting place of the Ngāti Kahungunu hapū of Ngāti Pōporo and Ngāti Rahunga.

In October 2020, the Government committed $6,020,910 from the Provincial Growth Fund to upgrade a group of 18 marae, including both Korongatā and Mangaroa. The funding was expected to create 39 jobs.

Education

Notable people 
Tori Reid - New Zealand rugby union player
Charlene Otene - Tall Fern, Silver Fern
Kevin Tamati - Kiwi Rugby League
Jack Maere - Tall Black
Caroline Evers-Swindell - Olympic rowing gold medalist
Georgina Evers-Swindell - Olympic rowing gold medalist, indoor rower
Peter Lyons - New Zealand Gliding champion
Taine Randell - All Black

References

Hastings District
Populated places in the Hawke's Bay Region